The 1997–98 NBA season was the Nets' 31st season in the National Basketball Association, and 22nd season in East Rutherford, New Jersey. The Nets had the seventh pick in the 1997 NBA draft, and selected Tim Thomas from Villanova, but soon traded him to the Philadelphia 76ers in exchange for top draft pick Keith Van Horn, Lucious Harris, Michael Cage and Don MacLean, then signed free agent Sherman Douglas on the first day of the regular season, which began on October 31, 1997. The Nets had a new look as the team changed their primary logo, and added new uniforms adding dark navy to their color scheme. A youth movement began to pay off as the Nets won their first four games, and played above .500 for the entire season, holding a 27–21 record at the All-Star break. At midseason, the team traded David Benoit, Kevin Edwards and Yinka Dare to the Orlando Magic in exchange for Rony Seikaly and second-year forward Brian Evans. Despite a 7-game losing streak between February and March, the Nets made the playoffs by finishing third in the Atlantic Division with a 43–39 record.

Van Horn shook off a preseason ankle injury, which cost him to miss the first month of the regular season, and averaged 19.7 points and 6.6 rebounds per game in 62 games, while being selected to the NBA All-Rookie First Team. He also finished in second place in Rookie of the Year voting behind Tim Duncan of the San Antonio Spurs. In addition, Sam Cassell finished second on the team in scoring with 19.6 points, led them with 8.0 assists and contributed 1.6 steals per game, while second-year star Kerry Kittles provided the team with 17.2 points and 1.7 steals per game, and Kendall Gill contributed 13.4 points and led the team with 1.9 steals per game. Jayson Williams averaged 12.9 points, led the Nets with 13.6 rebounds per game, and was selected for the 1998 NBA All-Star Game. Off the bench, sixth man Chris Gatling provided with 11.5 points and 5.9 rebounds per game, and Douglas contributed 8.0 points and 4.0 assists per game.

In the Eastern Conference First Round of the playoffs, the Nets faced off against Michael Jordan, Scottie Pippen, and the 2-time defending champion Chicago Bulls. However, due to injuries to Cassell (groin), Williams (thumb), and Van Horn (stomach virus), the Nets were swept by the Bulls in three straight games. The Bulls would go on to defeat the Utah Jazz in six games in the NBA Finals for their third consecutive championship, and sixth overall in eight years. 

Following the season, Douglas signed as a free agent with the Los Angeles Clippers, while Cage and MacLean were both traded to the Seattle SuperSonics, whom Cage used to play for, and Xavier McDaniel retired, although he was released to free agency during the regular season. The Nets new primary logo and home uniforms both remained in use until 2012, while the road jerseys lasted until 2009.

Off-season

NBA Draft

Roster

Roster notes
 Small forward Xavier McDaniel was waived on January 24.

Regular season

The Nets began the season by winning their first four games, and maintained a winning record through all 82 games for the first time in the franchise's NBA history. The Nets clinched a playoff berth with a victory over the Detroit Pistons on the final day of the season. It was the Nets first postseason appearance since 1994, and the season brought excitement back to the Meadowlands. The heart and soul of the Nets was center Jayson Williams, who averaged 13.6 rebounds, (2nd in the NBA), and 12.9 points per game.
Williams became the first Net to appear in an All-Star Game since 1994. After missing the first 17 games of the season due to a leg injury, rookie Keith Van Horn quickly acclimated himself to the NBA game and led the Nets in scoring at 19.7 points per game. Another strong presence in the frontcourt was forward Kendall Gill, who averaged 13.4 points per game.

The Nets backcourt consisted of Sam Cassell and Kerry Kittles in the backcourt. Cassell ranked second on the team in scoring, behind Van Horn at 19.6 ppg, and led the Nets in assists with 8.0 apg. Kittles was in his second NBA season, and was third on the team in scoring with 17.2 ppg. The Nets bench included Sherman Douglas (8.0 ppg, 4.0 apg) and Chris Gatling (11.5 ppg, 5.9 rpg). Late in the season, the Nets added depth with the trade for Rony Seikaly, who joined the Nets in a five-player trade with the Orlando Magic on Feb. 19. Seikaly played in only nine games for New Jersey, because of a nagging injury to his right foot.

Season standings

Record vs. opponents

Schedule

Playoffs
Injuries would become a problem in the playoffs for the Nets. In Game 1 against Chicago, Cassell nursed a strained groin and Williams played despite a broken thumb. Williams would manage to get 21 rebounds in the game. The Nets forced overtime at the United Center before falling by a score of 96-93. The Bulls ultimately swept the series, but the Nets' effort suggested that the team had a bright future.

|- align="center" bgcolor="#ffcccc"
| 1
| April 24
| @ Chicago
| L 93–96 (OT)
| Chris Gatling (24)
| Jayson Williams (21)
| Sherman Douglas (5)
| United Center23,844
| 0–1
|- align="center" bgcolor="#ffcccc"
| 2
| April 26
| @ Chicago
| L 91–96
| Kerry Kittles (23)
| Jayson Williams (11)
| Sherman Douglas (12)
| United Center23,844
| 0–2
|- align="center" bgcolor="#ffcccc"
| 3
| April 29
| Chicago
| L 101–116
| Sherman Douglas (19)
| Jayson Williams (10)
| Sherman Douglas (8)
| Continental Airlines Arena20,049
| 0–3

Player statistics

Regular season

|-
|Keith Van Horn
|62
|62
|37.5
|.426
|.308
|.846
|6.6
|1.7
|1.0
|0.4
|19.7
|-
|Sam Cassell
|75
|72
|34.7
|.441
|.188
|.860
|3.0
|8.0
|1.6
|0.3
|19.6
|-
|Kerry Kittles
|77
|76
|36.5
|.440
|.418
|.808
|4.7
|2.3
|1.7
|0.5
|17.2
|-
|Kendall Gill
|81
|81
|33.7
|.429
|.257
|.688
|4.8
|2.5
|1.9
|0.8
|13.4
|-
|Jayson Williams
|65
|65
|36.0
|.498
|.000
|.666
|13.6
|1.0
|0.7
|0.8
|12.9
|-
|Chris Gatling
|57
|16
|23.8
|.455
|.250
|.600
|5.9
|0.9
|0.9
|0.5
|11.5
|-
|Sherman Douglas
|80
|11
|21.2
|.495
|.304
|.669
|1.7
|4.0
|0.7
|0.1
|8.0
|-
|David Benoit
|53
|0
|15.1
|.379
|.345
|.841
|2.7
|0.3
|0.5
|0.3
|5.3
|-
|Rony Seikaly
|9
|2
|16.9
|.317
|
|.593
|4.0
|0.9
|0.3
|0.4
|4.7
|-
|Brian Evans
|28
|1
|11.9
|.434
|.405
|.667
|1.9
|0.9
|0.3
|0.2
|4.1
|-
|Lucious Harris
|50
|0
|13.4
|.390
|.308
|.745
|1.0
|0.8
|0.8
|0.1
|3.8
|-
|Kevin Edwards
|27
|5
|13.0
|.349
|.364
|.867
|1.3
|1.0
|0.8
|0.0
|3.4
|-
|David Vaughn
|15
|2
|10.7
|.576
|
|.667
|3.3
|0.1
|0.3
|0.3
|2.9
|-
|Jack Haley
|16
|0
|3.2
|.278
|.000
|.571
|0.9
|0.0
|0.0
|0.1
|1.4
|-
|Michael Cage
|79
|17
|15.2
|.512
|.000
|.556
|3.9
|0.4
|0.6
|0.6
|1.3
|-
|Xavier McDaniel
|20
|0
|9.0
|.333
|
|.625
|1.6
|0.5
|0.2
|0.1
|1.3
|-
|Yinka Dare
|10
|0
|6.0
|.222
|
|.500
|1.7
|0.1
|0.0
|0.2
|1.2
|-
|Don MacLean
|9
|0
|4.7
|.100
|.500
|
|0.6
|0.0
|0.0
|0.0
|0.3
|}

Playoffs

|-
|Sherman Douglas
|3
|2
|41.7
|.523
|.400
|.700
|2.7
|8.3
|2.0
|0.0
|18.3
|-
|Kerry Kittles
|3
|3
|42.0
|.425
|.385
|.909
|5.0
|2.7
|1.3
|0.7
|16.3
|-
|Chris Gatling
|3
|1
|27.0
|.500
|
|.667
|3.3
|0.7
|0.7
|0.7
|15.3
|-
|Kendall Gill
|3
|3
|33.3
|.450
|
|.875
|4.3
|1.0
|1.3
|0.3
|14.3
|-
|Keith Van Horn
|3
|3
|25.7
|.448
|.000
|.800
|3.0
|0.3
|0.0
|0.0
|12.7
|-
|Jayson Williams
|3
|2
|38.7
|.429
|
|.500
|14.0
|1.7
|0.7
|1.0
|7.0
|-
|Rony Seikaly
|3
|0
|12.3
|.778
|
|.667
|3.0
|0.0
|0.3
|0.0
|6.0
|-
|Lucious Harris
|3
|0
|17.3
|.333
|.000
|.833
|2.7
|0.3
|0.7
|0.0
|3.0
|-
|Sam Cassell
|3
|1
|8.7
|.333
|
|
|1.0
|1.7
|0.0
|0.3
|2.0
|-
|Brian Evans
|3
|0
|1.3
|
|
|
|0.3
|0.0
|0.0
|0.0
|0.0
|-
|David Vaughn
|1
|0
|1.0
|
|
|
|0.0
|0.0
|0.0
|1.0
|0.0
|}
Player Statistics Citation:

Awards, Records and Honors
 Jayson Williams, NBA All-Star Game
 Keith Van Horn, NBA All-Rookie Team 1st Team

Transactions

References

 New Jersey Nets on Database Basketball
 New Jersey Nets on Basketball Reference

New Jersey Nets season
New Jersey Nets seasons
New Jersey Nets
New Jersey Nets
20th century in East Rutherford, New Jersey
Meadowlands Sports Complex